Hutchinson is a manufacturer with its headquarters located in Paris, France. It is a subsidiary of TotalEnergies. In 1853, the company was founded by Hiram Hutchinson in the city of Châlette-sur-Loing, in Central France. It has more than 44,000 employees in 24 countries. Hutchinson offers products for aerospace and automotive industries as well as rail, construction, industry, and defense. It is the third largest non-tire rubber manufacturer in the world.

History

Late 19th century
 In 1853, the American engineer Hiram Hutchinson met Charles Goodyear in Paris where Hutchinson obtained patents from Goodyear, using a technological monopoly to create rubber products. A factory was founded in Langlée, near Montargis.
 In 1890, the company began the manufacture of bicycle tires.

1900–1920
 In 1903, Hutchinson diversified their operations from the manufacturing of bicycle tires and began manufacture of coated canvases for airplanes and airships.
 In 1918, Hutchinson headquarters moved to the Champs-Élysées in Paris.
 In 1920, Hutchinson expanded into other sectors, including shoes, clothing, Textile, automobile, motorcycle, bicycle, heavyweights, balloon, heels,  mats, belts, gaskets for jars.

1930–1980
 In 1934, Jean-Felix Paulsen and Stratosky, former colleagues at Citroën, founded the company 'Paulstra' to develop a method for adhering rubber to metal. In 1965, the Paulstra brand produced over fifteen million pairs of gloves. 
 In 1973, Hutchinson and Mapa merged and Jean-Felix Paulsen sold Paulstra to Hutchinson Mapa (which was renamed Hutchinson in 1981).
 In 1974, the company Total took a majority stake in the Hutchinson. The new company had 13,500 employees across 26 different sites. The Hutchinson Group focused its major markets in automobiles and heavy industry.
 In 1986, Hutchinson acquired two new companies: Le Joint Français (rubber manufacturer) and the Corduroy Rubber Company.

Markets 
Hutchinson’s main focuses are Automotive and Aerospace.  But they also create products for Rail, Industry, Defense, and Energy markets.

Automotive 
Hutchinson entered the Automotive Industry when it began making car tires in 1903. The company no longer makes tires and instead manufactures parts for the interior of automobiles that prevent vibration, manage fluids, and create seals. Hutchinson’s products can be found on popular car models such as the Mazda 3.

Aerospace 
Hutchinson entered the Aerospace industry in 1910 when it began to manufacture coated canvas for airships like the Astra Torres and airplanes like the Nieuport biplane. Hutchinson continues to manufacture products for a variety of aircraft including commercial aircraft, regional and business jets, other types of airplanes, and even helicopters.

Hutchinson Aerospace Services 

Hutchinson Aerospace Services launched in 2019 to provide aftermarket aerospace services to OEMs and airlines customers.

Products 
Hutchinson makes Body Sealing Systems, Precision Sealing Systems, Fluid Management Systems, Materials & Structures, Vibration Control Systems, and Belt Drive Systems.

Anti-vibration 
Vibration control parts and systems such as the SmartDamper® reduce engine noise. 

Hutchinson’s suspension systems can be found on the Mazda 3.

Sealing Systems 

Hutchinson develops seals, sealants, membranes, etc. These seals can be seen surrounding edges of car doors or windows, for example. Precision Sealing products such as o-rings have both automotive and industrial applications. In July 2019, Hutchinson signed a contract to supply sealing systems to Airbus and Boeing.

Fluid Management 
Hutchinson’s Fluid Management Systems transport liquids like water, air, gas, etc. throughout a vehicle. Examples include engine cooling, fuel injection, air conditioning, braking, among others. Hutchinson’s fluid management systems can be found on the Airbus Helicopter H160.

Fab Houses 

Hutchinson has a presence on five continents. Its main manufacturing locations are Europe, Asia, and North America, the same locations as the company’s meeting centers, which they call a Fab House. In 2016, the 507 Fab House and the 616 Fab House opened in France and the United States, respectively. The Fab House in China, called 822, opened in 2019. Hutchinson has multiple plants in China, Poland, and the United States. Recently, the company has pushed to digitize all their plants to optimize processes.

Research 
Hutchinson has a history of creating products to reduce carbon dioxide emissions. The company participates in European Commission funded research initiatives such as Clean Sky, the goal of which is to reduce the impact of air travel on the environment. Hutchinson is the coordinator of two Clean Sky 2 projects focusing on air treatment and temperature control in aircraft. In 2017, the company hosted a student research competition in the 507 Fab House.

Hutchinson and its partner Electreon are members of The Smart Road Gotland Consortium, the goal of which is to develop electric roads. The technology allows vehicles to charge while driving via coils embedded in the roadway. Electrive explains, “The coils are embedded eight centimetres below the surface, invisible to road users, and only activated when a vehicle drives over them.” Hutchinson manufactures these coils. Electreon participated in a pilot project for the Swedish Transport Administration electric road program where Electreon embedded its technology in a one-mile stretch of road on the island of Gotland.

Major Acquisitions 
Hutchinson has acquired many companies with varying expertise. In 1974 Hutchinson acquired Paulstra, a company which specializes in vibration and acoustic insulation.  

The company made multiple acquisitions in 2019. In January, Hutchinson announced the acquisition of an American parts manufacturer called Midé Technology.

In September, Hutchinson acquired a thermal management company called TCSA from Mann+Hummel. “TCSA is now a joint venture between the two companies, dedicated to thermal management and cooling systems for vehicles, particularly EV and HEV and integrated in Hutchinson’s FMS (Fluid Management Systems) activity.” 

Later that month, Hutchinson announced its acquisition of German aerospace company, PFW. The acquisition was completed in January 2020.

References

External links
 Official web site

Tire manufacturers of France
Cycle parts manufacturers
Manufacturing companies based in Paris
Companies established in 1853
French brands